Georgian Business Week (GBW) is one of the English language newspapers in Georgia, Tbilisi-based weekly founded by ltd Bziph and currently published by Georgian Business Week Ltd.
Since 2006, Georgian Business Week has been a member of Georgian Business Consulting Media Holding (GBC), business-focused media holding, owned by the Georgian Industrial Group .

GBW runs profiles of local businesses, stock market information, expert opinion, budget and legislative commentary, financial analysis and other related topics. The newspaper’s readers include diplomats, leading political and economic figures, top business executives. GBW has an approximate circulation of 5,000.
In 2008 and 2007, Georgian Business Week has been an official media partner of the annual Economic Forum in Crynica, Poland. GBW has also been a media partner of a number of local and foreign business forums including in Tel Aviv, Israel in 2007.

The GBW articles have received awards from outstanding local and international organizations, including the International Finance Corporation (IFC), the European Bank for Reconstruction and Development (EBRD) and Tbilisi-based Addiction Research Center Alternative Georgia.

In May 2008, along with GBC Media Holding, Georgian Business Week joined ICC-Georgia, which is the Georgian national committee of the International Chamber of Commerce, a global business organization which unites member companies from over 130 countries.

External links
www.gbw.ge official website of Georgian Business Week
Official site of American Chamber of Commerce in Georgia
www.gbc.ge official website GBC Media Holding
www.forum-ekonomiczne.pl official website of Economic Forum in Crynica
https://web.archive.org/web/20090429192513/http://www.gyla.ge/files/publications/s3q0mz2ntk.pdf
http://www.civil.ge/eng/article.php?id=16600
 Georgian Media
https://web.archive.org/web/20110706131423/http://www.azerbaijantoday.az/ARCHIVE/12/economics3.html
https://web.archive.org/web/20090429192513/http://www.gyla.ge/files/publications/s3q0mz2ntk.pdf
http://www.kas.de/upload/Publikationen/2008/dr_georgia.pdf
http://www.jamestown.org/single/?no_cache=1&tx_ttnews[tt_news]=31294

Notes

Business newspapers
Newspapers published in Georgia (country)
Mass media in Tbilisi
Mass media companies of Georgia (country)
Weekly newspapers
Companies based in Tbilisi